Włodzimierz Cimoszewicz (born 13 September 1950) is a Polish left-wing politician who served as Prime Minister of Poland for a year from 7 February 1996 to 31 October 1997, after being defeated in the Parliamentary elections by the Solidarity Electoral Action (AWS). He was born in Warsaw.

Career
Cimoszewicz was a member of the left-wing Democratic Left Alliance the leftist candidate in the Polish presidential election of 1990, receiving 9 percent of the vote.

Cimoszewicz was the Prime Minister of Poland from 1996 to late 1997. October 1996, he became the chairman (office in the rank of minister) of the newly established Committee for European Integration, responsible for preparing Poland for accession negotiations with the European Union. He held this position until October 31, 1997.In October 1996, he became the chairman (office in the rank of minister) of the newly established Committee for European Integration, responsible for preparing Poland for accession negotiations with the European Union. He held this position until October 31, 1997.

Cimoszewicz was the Foreign Minister of Poland in the governments of Leszek Miller (2001–2004) and Marek Belka (2004–2005). It was during this time that he, along with Leszek Miller, signed the Accession Treaty that paved way to Polish membership in the European Union.

Cimoszewicz was the speaker of the Sejm (lower chamber of the Polish parliament) from January to October 2005.

Cimoszewicz was for a time a candidate for the 2005 Polish presidential election; but he withdrew before the elections and promised to abandon politics.

On 28 June 2005, Cimoszewicz declared his intent to run for Polish President (see: Election 2005). He instantly became a leader in the polls. He ran previously in 1990 and received 9.21 percent of the vote. In 1990, Lech Wałęsa and Stan Tymiński went on to the second round. Cimoszewicz did not run in the years 1995 and 2000 giving way to his close colleague Aleksander Kwaśniewski who twice became president. His election committee was chaired by the wife of President Kwaśniewski, Jolanta Kwaśniewska.

On 9 July 2005, Cimoszewicz caused a major political uproar by refusing to testify in front of the Orlen commission. He accused seven of its eight members of being politically motivated, partial and bent on undermining his presidential bid. Constitutional experts are split on whether his move was constitutional or if Cimoszewicz broke the law. Fifty-eight percent of Poles disapproved of Cimoszewicz's behaviour before the commission.

According to a poll by Rzeczpospolita, Cimoszewicz was a "hands down" leader on 5 July 2005:

 Cimoszewicz: 28%
 Kaczyński: 19%
 Lepper: 17%
 Religa: 15%
 Tusk: 11%
 Borowski: 5%

He was predicted to win the second round, independent of who was going to reach it from second place. The election was won by Lech Kaczyński.

Cimoszewicz returned to politics during the 2007 parliamentary election, when he won a Senate seat as an independent candidate. He kept his senator's seat until the end of term in 2015. 

In 2009, he was one of two candidates to replace Terry Davis as Secretary General of the Council of Europe. However, in September 2009, the Parliamentary Assembly of the Council of Europe elected candidate Thorbjørn Jagland as the new secretary general.

Since 2015 Cimoszewicz is workstream leader for the Agency for the Modernisation of Ukraine (AMU), where he is responsible for combatting corruption.

In the 2019 European Parliament election Cimoszewicz was elected as the MEP for the Warsaw constituency.

On Ukraine
In May 2014 Cimoszewicz told an audience that he was unhappy with the way the Russian annexation of Crimea was handled. "The democratic West has so far not reacted in a proper way... If we do not stop that aggressive [Russian] policy at an early stage then we can face a much more difficult situation requiring more efforts taking higher risks... There is one element of that crisis which will be very difficult to be solved: the fate of Crimea."

References

|-

|-

|-

1950 births
Candidates in the 1990 Polish presidential election
Candidates in the 2005 Polish presidential election
Democratic Left Alliance politicians
Deputy Prime Ministers of Poland
Living people
Honorary Knights Grand Cross of the Order of St Michael and St George
Justice ministers of Poland
Marshals of the Sejm of the Third Polish Republic
Deputy Marshals of the Sejm of the Third Polish Republic
Members of the Polish Sejm 1991–1993
Members of the Polish Sejm 1993–1997
Members of the Polish Sejm 1997–2001
Members of the Polish Sejm 2001–2005
MEPs for Poland 2019–2024
Ministers of Foreign Affairs of Poland
Polish atheists
Polish Round Table Talks participants
Polish United Workers' Party members
Politicians from Warsaw
Prime Ministers of Poland
Recipients of the Order of the White Star, 1st Class
Academic staff of the University of Białystok
Columbia University alumni
University of Warsaw alumni